Granville Porter Taylor (born September 17, 1950) is the sixth and immediate past Episcopal Bishop of Western North Carolina. In March 2015 he announced his intent to retire. He was succeeded as bishop by the Rt. Rev. José Antonio McLoughlin.  Taylor was appointed for a two-year term as Assisting Bishop in 2020 for the Episcopal Diocese of Virginia.

Biography
Taylor was born in Rock Hill, South Carolina, but raised in Asheville, North Carolina. He earned his Bachelor of Arts degree in English from the University of North Carolina at Chapel Hill in 1972, followed by a Master of Arts in English from the University of South Carolina (1974) and a Ph.D. in Theology and Literature from Emory University (1983).

In 1993, he received a Master of Divinity from the University of the South, Sewanee and was ordained a deacon. He was ordained a priest on April 13, 1994, and served seven years as rector of St. Gregory the Great Church in Athens, Georgia.

He was consecrated as the fifth Bishop of the Diocese of Western North Carolina on September 18, 2004. The 999th bishop consecrated in the Episcopal Church, he was consecrated by Robert Carroll Johnson Jr., Robert Hodges Johnson, Frank Allan, Michael Curry, and J. Neil Alexander at the Asheville Civic Center.

He is the author of To Dream as God Dreams: Sermons of Hope, Conversion, and Community and From Anger to Zion: An Alphabet of Faith. He and his wife, Jo Abbott Taylor (a research nurse), married in 1972; they have two children, Arthur and Marie. Arthur achieved his graduate degree (Ph.D.) in psychology at New York University, and currently lives in Atlanta, Georgia with his wife and two children. Bishop Taylor's daughter, Marie, who spent a year at Randolph College (formally Randolph-Macon Women's College), transferred and graduated from Western Carolina University, with a B.S. in Anthropology, and recently finished her master's degree in GIS from the University of Southern California.

In 2016, Taylor was named the Visiting Professor of Episcopal Studies at Wake Forest University's School of Divinity.

References

1950 births
Living people
People from Rock Hill, South Carolina
People from Asheville, North Carolina
Sewanee: The University of the South alumni
University of North Carolina at Chapel Hill alumni
Writers from South Carolina
Writers from North Carolina
American Episcopal theologians
American Christian writers
Episcopal Church in North Carolina
Episcopal bishops of Western North Carolina